Bulbophyllum finisterrae is a species of orchid in the genus Bulbophyllum that is native to the Epiphyte in the lower montane forest of New Guinea. Bulbophyllum finisterrae was discovered by Rudolf Schlechter. The Bulbophyllum finisterrae has yellow petals and flowers in January.

References
The Bulbophyllum-Checklist
The Internet Orchid Species Photo Encyclopedia
Orchids New Guinea

finisterrae